The 2016 Oklahoma City Energy FC season is the club's third season in existence, and their third  season playing in the USL, the third tier of the American soccer pyramid.

Background 
This is the second season where Oklahoma City Energy FC plays its full season at Taft Stadium. KSBI-TV will air all Energy FC matches this season. Energy FC qualified for the playoffs again this season as a 7th seed but lost to Vancouver Whitecaps FC 2 in the Conference Semi-finals.

Review

Roster 
As of 8/20/2016

Competitions

USL

Results summary

USL playoffs

First round

Conference Semi-finals

Standings

U.S. Open Cup 

Oklahoma City Energy FC will enter Open Cup in the second round.

Statistics

Transfers

Transfers In

Loans in

References 

2016 USL season
American soccer clubs 2016 season
2016 in sports in Oklahoma
2016